Pamela Henderson Hatch (fl. 1990s–2000s) is an American politician from Maine. Hatch, a Democrat from Skowhegan, served 5 terms in the Maine Legislature between 1992 and 2004. She served four terms (8 years) in the Maine House of Representatives (District 100 and 98) from 1992 to 2000 and served as committee chair for Labor and Transportation. In November 2002, Hatch was elected to the Maine Senate. She served a single term and was replaced by Republican Peter Mills when her and her spouse officially retired after a serious automobile accident. Married to Paul Hatch, who also served in the Maine House and as a Somerset County Commissioner.  2 daughters, Paula and Victoria.

Hatch is a graduate of Penobscot Valley High School in Howland, Maine and University of MaineUniversity of Maine.

References

Year of birth missing (living people)
Living people
People from Skowhegan, Maine
Democratic Party members of the Maine House of Representatives
Democratic Party Maine state senators
Women state legislators in Maine
School board members in Maine
21st-century American politicians
21st-century American women politicians